John Ednie Brown, (1848–1899) J.P., F.L.S., was an author on sylviculture and state conservator of forests.

Biography 
The author's contemporary entry in George E. Loyau's Notable South Australians relates his biographical details:

He was commissioned in 1895 to produce a report on forest resources for the state government of Western Australia, undertaking research that included journeying over five thousand kilometres in a year, and leading to the formation of the Department of Woods and Forests, of which he was appointed to head as the first conservator. During his tenure he encouraged the introduction of softwood plantations and sandalwood, and is credited with a fivefold increase in the export value of the state's hardwood resources. His reporting was regarded as careful and considered, despite his prodigious output. A reprint in 1899 of his extensive 1896 report is amongst his published works.

He had three sons with his wife, Bertha Amelia, the daughter of James Doughty Willshire. John Ednie Brown died at Cottesloe, Western Australia of complications arising from influenza and was buried at North Fremantle.

References 

1848 births
1899 deaths
Botanists active in Australia
Botanists active in California